A set function is called fractionally subadditive (or XOS) if it is the maximum of several additive set functions.
This valuation class was defined, and termed XOS, by Noam Nisan, in the context of combinatorial auctions. The term fractionally-subadditive was given by Uriel Feige.

Definition 
There is a finite base set of items, .

The function   is called fractionally-subadditive (or XOS) if there exists a collection of set functions, such that:
 The function  is the pointwise maximum of the functions . I.e, for every subset :

Equivalent Definition 

Relation to other utility functions 
Every submodular set function is XOS, and every XOS function is a subadditive set function.

See also: Utility functions on indivisible goods.

References 

Utility function types